Events in the year 2009 in the Islamic Republic of Iran.

Incumbents
 Supreme Leader: Ali Khamenei
 President: Mahmoud Ahmadinejad
 Vice President: 
 until 25 July: Parviz Davoodi
 17 July–25 July: Esfandiar Rahim Mashaei
 starting 13 September: Mohammad Reza Rahimi
 Chief Justice: Mahmoud Hashemi Shahroudi (until 30 June), Sadeq Larijani (starting 30 June)

Events

 February 2 – Iran's first domestically constructed satellite, Omid, is launched.
 March 7 – Morocco terminates diplomatic relations with Iran.
 March 18 – Somali pirates hijack an Iranian fishing vessel in the Gulf of Aden.
 April 18 – Iranian-American journalist Roxana Saberi is charged with espionage and imprisoned in Iran until 2017.
 May 4 – A bus collides with a building in Īlām Province, Iran, killing 28 people and injuring nine others.
 May 20 – Iran launches a Sejjil-2 medium-range surface-to-surface missile.
 May 30 – A bomb is discovered and defused aboard a Kish Air flight between Ahvaz and Tehran, Iran.
 June 12 – Iran goes to the polls for its presidential election.
 June 13 – Mahmoud Ahmadinejad is reelected as the President of Iran, although opposition leader Mir-Hossein Mousavi demands a recount.
 June 20 – A suicide bomb reportedly explodes at the shrine of former Grand Ayatollah Ruhollah Khomeini.
 June 22 – The Iranian Revolutionary Guard warns that it will 'crush' any further protests.
 June 23 – The Guardian Council rules out a re-run of the presidential election saying that there was no sign of serious electoral fraud in the June 12 vote.
 June 24 – Supreme Leader Ayatollah Ali Khamenei declares the recent election result will stand.
 July 15 – Caspian Airlines Flight 7908, flying from Tehran to Yerevan, Armenia with 153 passengers and 15 crew members on board, crashes in Iran shortly after takeoff.
 July 24 – Aria Air Flight 1525 crashes in Mashhad, Iran, killing at least 17 people and injuring 19 of the 153 people on board.
 July 28 – Iran releases 140 people detained in its post-election unrest as the supreme leader orders a prison where jailed protesters were killed be closed.
 July 30 – Iranian police clash with mourners at a Tehranian cemetery for a memorial to those killed in post-election violence, using teargas to disperse crowds from the grave of Neda Agha-Soltan and forcing Opposition leader Mir-Hossein Mousavi to make his exit.
 August 3 – Iran's Supreme Leader Ali Khamenei formally approves the second-term presidency of Mahmoud Ahmadinejad.
 August 5 – Mahmoud Ahmadinejad is sworn in as President of Iran for a second term.
 October 18 – 2009 Pishin bombing: a suicide bomber detonated explosives at a meeting in the southeastern Iranian town of Pishin in Sistan and Baluchestan Province. The attack killed at least 43 people including several senior commanders of Iran's Revolutionary Guards, and injured a further 150. The Sunni rebel organization Jundallah claimed responsibility for the attack.
 November 4 – Around 700 people are injured in two earthquakes in southern Iran.
 November 9 – Three American hikers detained on the border between Iraqi Kurdistan and Iran are to be charged for espionage by Iranian authorities.
 November 29 – The Iranian government approves plans to build 10 new uranium enrichment plants.
 December 28 – Iran declares martial law in Najafabad following a week of protest and 2 days of violence.

Full date unknown
United4Iran organization is established.

Notable deaths
 January 30 – Safar Iranpak, 61, Iranian footballer, lung cancer.
 February 2 – Ezzat Negahban, c. 82, Iranian archaeologist.
 March 21 – Khadijeh Saqafi, 93, Iranian widow of religious/political leader Ruhollah Khomeini, after long illness.
 May 1 – Delara Darabi, 22, Iranian convicted murderer, executed by hanging.
 May 15 – Mohammad-Amin Riahi, 86, Iranian historian and literary scholar.
 May 17 – Mohammad-Taqi Bahjat Foumani, 96, Iranian cleric, heart disease.
 June 20 – Neda Agha-Soltan, 26, Iranian student, shot.
 June 29 – Mohammad Hoqouqi, 72, Iranian poet, cirrhosis.
 August 11 – Behjat Sadr, 85, Iranian painter, heart attack.
 September 21 – Parviz Meshkatian, 54, Iranian musician and composer, cardiac arrest.
 November 9 – Mehdi Sahabi, 66, Iranian writer and translator, heart attack.
 November 10 – Ramin Pourandarjani, 26, Iranian doctor, whistleblower on use of torture, poisoned.
 November 11 – Ehsan Fatahian, 28, Iranian Kurdish activist, executed by hanging.
 November 17 – Niku Kheradmand, 77, Iranian actress, complications of a heart attack.
 November 22 – Ali Kordan, 51, Iranian politician, Minister of the Interior (2008), multiple myeloma.
 December 9 – Faramarz Payvar, 77, Iranian composer and santur player, brain damage.
 December 19 – Grand Ayatollah Hussein-Ali Montazeri, 87, Iranian cleric and dissident, natural causes.

References

External links